Manassas is a city in Tattnall County, Georgia, United States. Per the 2020 census, the population was 59.

History
The community was named after Manassas Foy, the son of a local citizen. The Georgia General Assembly incorporated Manassas as a city in 1920.

Geography

Manassas is located at  (32.164091, -82.021337).

Demographics

2020 census

Note: the US Census treats Hispanic/Latino as an ethnic category. This table excludes Latinos from the racial categories and assigns them to a separate category. Hispanics/Latinos can be of any race.

2000 Census
As of the census of 2000, there were 100 people, 40 households, and 24 families residing in the city. The racial makeup of the city was 41.00% White and 59.00% African American.

There were 40 households, out of which 20.0% had children under the age of 18 living with them, 37.5% were married couples living together, 17.5% had a female householder with no husband present, and 40.0% were non-families. 32.5% of all households were made up of individuals, and 22.5% had someone living alone who was 65 years of age or older. The average household size was 2.50 and the average family size was 3.17.

In the city, the population was spread out, with 22.0% under the age of 18, 10.0% from 18 to 24, 20.0% from 25 to 44, 31.0% from 45 to 64, and 17.0% who were 65 years of age or older. The median age was 43 years. For every 100 females, there were 75.4 males. For every 100 females age 18 and over, there were 81.4 males.

The median income for a household in the city was $13,750, and the median income for a family was $26,250. Males had a median income of $33,750 versus $13,750 for females. The per capita income for the city was $12,698. There were 28.6% of families and 46.8% of the population living below the poverty line, including 68.4% of under eighteens and 50.0% of those over 64.

References

Cities in Georgia (U.S. state)
Cities in Tattnall County, Georgia